This is a list of supervillainess characters that can be found in American comic books and associated mediums. They are a counterpart to the superheroine, just as the villain is the counterpart to the hero.

Comic books

Marvel Comics

Avengers villains
 Alkhema
 Bombshell
 Dragonfly
 Gladiatrix
 Lascivious
 Letha
 Man-Killer
 Nightshade
 Poundcakes
 Princess Python
 Ruby Thursday
 Terminatrix
 Umar
 Viper
 Volcana
 Yellowjacket

Black Widow villains
 Black Lotus
 Black Widow (Yelena Belova)
 Iron Maiden
 Snapdragon
 Wrangler

Captain America villains
 Anaconda
 Asp
 Black Mamba
 Black Racer
 Coachwhip
 Diamondback
 Fer-de-Lance
 Mysteria
 Sin
 Superia

Captain Marvel villains
 Moonstone

Cosmic villains
 Aegis
 Nebula

Daredevil villains
 Lady Bullseye
 Shock
 Typhoid Mary

Ghost Rider villains
 Hag
 Heart Attack
 Lillith
 Steel Wind
 Witch Woman

Hulk villains
 Harpy
 Mercy
 Vapor
 Water Witch

Iron Man villains
 Crimson Cowl
 Madame Masque

She-Hulk villains
 Abominatrix
 Figment
 Silencer
 Southpaw
 Titania
 Ultima
 Unum

Spider-Man villains
 Aura
 Beetle
 Black Cat
 Bloodlust
 Calypso
 Joystick
 Knockout
 Kraven the Hunter (Ana Kravinoff)
 Lady Octopus
 Medea
 Mindblast
 Paper Doll
 Poison
 Scorpia
 Scream
 Screwball
 Shriek
 Whiplash
 White Rabbit

Spider-Woman villains
 Dansen Macabre
 Gypsy Moth/Skein
 Morgan le Fay
 Nekra

Thor villains
 Enchantress
 Hela
 Karnilla
 Lorelei
 Quicksand

X-Men villains
 Adrienne Frost
 Arclight
 Astra
 Bella Donna
 Siena Blaze
 Blindspot
 Candra
 Cassandra Nova
 Catseye
 Chimera
 Copycat
 Dark Phoenix
 Deathbird
 Destiny
 Dragoness
 Emma Frost
 Famine
 Fatale
 Gargouille
 Haven
 Infectia
 Joanna Cargill (as Frenzy)
 Kimura
 Lady Deathstrike
 Lady Mastermind
 Lorelei
 Madelyne Pryor (as the Goblin Queen)
 Malice
 Mystique
 Phantazia
 Pink Pearl
 Saturnyne
 Selene
 Spiral
 Vertigo
 Zaladane

Other Marvel villains
 Lucia von Bardas
 Bloodtide
 Dragonrider
 Ecstasy
 Ereshkigal
 Fault Zone
 Foxfire
 Gilded Lily
 Delphyne Gorgon
 Hera
 Hippolyta
 Impala
 Inferno
 Ion
 Javelynn
 Lady Dorma
 Lodestone
 Magneta
 Mercy
 Paragon
 Pretty Persuasions
 Sphinx
 Spider-Woman (Charlotte Witter)
 Stained Glass Scarlet
 Terraxia
 The Wink

DC Comics

Aquaman villains 
 Siren

Batman villains
 Catwoman
 Duela Dent
 Harley Quinn
 Magpie
 March Harriet
 Orca
 Phantasm
 Poison Ivy
 Talia al Ghul
 Roxy Rocket

Flash villains
 Golden Glider
 Magenta
Killer Frost (at first)
Reverse-Flash

Green Arrow villains
 China White
 Cupid
 Onyx
 Shado

New Gods villains
 Amazing Grace
 Bernadeth
 Bloody Mary
 Gilotina
 Granny Goodness
 Knockout
 Lashina

Superman villains
 Faora
 Livewire
 Maxima 
 Silver Banshee
 Ursa

Teen Titans villains
 Blackfire
 Cheshire
 H.I.V.E  
 Jinx
 Madame Rouge
 Rose Wilson
 Shimmer
 Terra

Wonder Woman villains
 Astarte
 Blue Snowman
 Cassie Arnold
 Cheetah
 Circe
 Dark Angel
 Decay
 Devastation
 Disdain
 Doctor Cyber
 Doctor Poison
 Eviless
 Fausta Grables
 Genocide
 Giganta
 Gundra the Valkyrie
 Hecate
 Hypnota
 The Mask
 Medusa
 Osira
 Paula von Gunther
 Queen Atomia
 Queen Clea
 Queen Mikra
 Queen of Fables
 Sharkeeta
 Silver Swan
 Trinity
 Veronica Cale
 Zara

Other DC villains
 Bizarra
 Blacksmith
 Blaze
 Deuce
 Divine (Power Girl Clone)
 Double Dare
 Emerald Empress
 Enchantress
 Enigma
 Fatality
 Fright
 Gamemnae
 Gemini
 Glorith
 Godiva
 Goldilocks
 Harlequin
 Hazard
 Heggra
 Hyena
 Indigo
 Inque
 Jeannette
 Jewelee
 Killer Frost
 Lady Clay
 Lady Shiva
 Lady Vic
 Lazara
 Leather
 Mist
 New Wave
 Nocturna
 Nyssa Raatko
 Paula Brooks as Tigress
 Phobia
 Plastique
 Prank
 Queen Bee
 Rampage (DC Comics)
 Riddler's Daughter
 Roulette
 Saturn Queen
 Scandal Savage
 She-Bat
 Spider Girl
 Star Sapphire
 Sun Girl
 Superwoman as a member of the Crime Syndicate of America
 Tala
 Tigress
 Viper
 Ventriloquist

Other comics
 Angelus (Image Comics)
 Animora (Mystic)
 Bomb Queen (Image Comics)
 Celestine (Image Comics)
 Dragon Lady
 Evinlea (Negation)
 Fem Paragon (Femforce)
 Ingra (The First)
 Jessica Priest (Image Comics)
 Karai
 Mai Shen (Scion)
 Mothergod (Valiant Comics)
 Sailor Galaxia (Kodansha manga)
 Rad (Femforce)
 Tiffany (Image Comics)
 Valentina (from Darna)
 Zera (Image Comics)

American Animation

2D
 Wuya (Xiaolin Showdown) 
 Baby Doll (Batman: The Animated Series only) 
 Baroness (G.I. Joe)  
 Doctor Blight (Captain Planet)
 Eris (The Grim Adventures of Billy and Mandy) 
 Frightwig, Joey/Rojo, Forever Princess Judith and Charmcaster (Ben 10) 
 Galatea (Justice League Unlimited only)
 Inque (Batman Beyond Only)
 Lady Kale (Princess Gwenevere and the Jewel Riders) 
 Morgana (Princess Gwenevere and the Jewel Riders)
 Penelope Spectra and Ember McLain (Danny Phantom)
 Sedusa and Femme Fatale (The Powerpuff Girls)
 Shego (Kim Possible) 
 Talon (Static Shock) 
 Zarana (G.I.Joe)

3D
 Lamprey (Shadow Raiders) Hexadecimal (ReBoot) 
 Daemon (ReBoot)  
 Scarlet Overkill ("Minions (film)")

Live action TV
 Astronema (Power Rangers: Lost Galaxy) was turned to good by Zordon's energy wave. 
 Azkadellia (Tin Man) was turned back to good 
 Chase (Blade: The Series)
 Christine White (The 10th Kingdom) 
 Divatox (Power Rangers: Turbo)was turned human by Zordon's energy wave 
 Irina Derevko (Alias)
 Ice (Amazing Extraordinary Friends)
 Raina (Cleopatra 2525)

See also
 List of superheroines
 Villain
 Supervillain
 Femme fatale

References 

Supervillains
Female supervillains